Under the Whyte notation for the classification of steam locomotive wheel arrangements, a 4-4-6-2 is a locomotive with two pairs of leading wheels, one set of four driving wheels, a second set of six driving wheels, and a pair of trailing wheels.

Other equivalent classifications are:
UIC classification: 2BC1 (also known as German classification and Swiss classification)
Italian and French classification: 220+031
The equivalent UIC classification is refined to (2′B)C1′ for Mallet locomotives. 

This wheel arrangement was rare. Only two are known to have been built, both as compound Mallet locomotives by Baldwin Locomotive Works in 1909 for the Atchison, Topeka and Santa Fe Railway. They were initially numbered 1300 and 1301 but soon re-numbered 1398 and 1399. 

These locomotives were perhaps the first and only attempt to adapt the Mallet-compound design for passenger service, having been built with 73-inch driving wheels. The experiment was unsuccessful: Adhesion stability was a problem, as the front engine tended to slip uncontrollably because of an imbalance of tractive effort at passenger-train speeds (this was a common problem with compound Mallets, at any speed much above walking pace). Both locomotives were rebuilt to non-compound 4-6-2 types in 1915, retained their assigned numbers, and were still in use on the AT&SF as of 1944. They were retired by 1950.

References

Atchison, Topeka and Santa Fe Railway locomotives
Steam locomotives of the United States
Railway locomotives introduced in 1915